The Ormond Fire House is a historic building located at 160 East Granada Boulevard in Ormond Beach, Florida. It was added to the National Register of Historic Places on December 15, 2010.

See also
National Register of Historic Places listings in Volusia County, Florida

References

Fire stations completed in 1937
Government buildings completed in 1937
Fire stations on the National Register of Historic Places in Florida
Defunct fire stations in Florida
National Register of Historic Places in Volusia County, Florida
Spanish Colonial Revival architecture in Florida